Michael Joseph Ryan (27 September 1917 – 19 October 1986) was an Australian rules footballer who represented  in the Victorian Football League (VFL) during the 1930s and 1940s. Ryan topped Footscray's goalkicking in 1945 with 37 goals and won the club's best and fairest the following two seasons. 

He was the brother of former Footscray team-mate Bill, son of Collingwood footballer Michael, and the nephew of Collingwood premiership player David.

References

External links

1917 births
1986 deaths
Australian rules footballers from Melbourne
Western Bulldogs players
Western Bulldogs coaches
Charles Sutton Medal winners
People from Footscray, Victoria